The 1988–89 Robert Morris Colonials men's basketball team represented Robert Morris University in the 1988–89 NCAA Division I basketball season. Robert Morris was coached by Jarrett Durham and played their home games at the Charles L. Sewall Center in Moon Township, PA. The Colonials were members of the Northeast Conference. They finished the season 21–9, 12–4 in NEC play. They won the 1989 Northeast Conference men's basketball tournament to earn the conference's automatic bid to the 1989 NCAA Division I men's basketball tournament. They earned a 16 seed in the West Region and played top-ranked, No. 1 seed Arizona in the first round. The Colonials were beaten 94–60 to end their season.

Roster

Schedule and results

|-
!colspan=9| Regular season

|-
!colspan=9| NEC tournament

|-
!colspan=10| NCAA tournament

Awards and honors
Vaughn Luton – NEC Player of the Year
Jarrett Durham – NEC Coach of the Year

References

Robert Morris Colonials
Robert Morris
Robert Morris Colonials men's basketball seasons
Robert
Robert